The Master Mechanic's House, at 333 S. Willard St. in Cottonwood, Arizona, was built in 1918.  It was listed on the National Register of Historic Places in 1986.

It is related to the UVX smelter complex on Willard.

It was deemed notable as "One of two local examples of the Craftsman Bungalow style and one of two extant residences constructed by the UVX mining company to house
supervisory personnel."

References

National Register of Historic Places in Yavapai County, Arizona
Houses completed in 1918
Buildings and structures in Yavapai County, Arizona
1918 establishments in Arizona